The Dhammapada / Introduced & Translated by Eknath Easwaran is an English-language book originally published in 1986. It contains Easwaran's translation of the Dhammapada, a Buddhist scripture traditionally ascribed to the Buddha himself. The book also contains a substantial overall introduction of about 70 pages, together with introductory notes to each of the Dhammapada 26 chapters. English-language editions have also been published in the UK and India, and a re-translation of the full book has been published in German.
and Korean.<ref
     name=korean18></ref><ref
      name=npnonus>Non-US Editions of Nilgiri Press Books , accessed 24 April 2011.</ref>

Topics covered
Both US editions of The Dhammapada contain Easwaran's general introduction, followed by his translations from the original Pali of the Dhammapada's 26 chapters. Selections from Easwaran's chapter titles, which in some cases differ from other translations, are shown in the table at below left.

The 2007 edition contains a foreword in which Easwaran states that he translated the Dhammapada for "kindred spirits:" "men and women in every age and culture" who "thrill" to the Dhammapada message that "the wider field of consciousness is our native land.... The world of the senses is just a base camp: we are meant to be as much at home in consciousness as in the world of physical reality."

Each US edition's Introduction opens with a claim, mentioned by several reviewers, about the value of the Dhammapada within the corpus of Buddhist literature:

"If all of the New Testament had been lost, it has been said, and only the Sermon on the Mount had managed to survive these two thousand years of history, we would still have all that is necessary for following the teachings of Jesus the Christ..... Buddhist scripture is much more voluminous than the Bible, but... if everything else were lost, we would need nothing more than the Dhammapada to follow the way of the Buddha."
The introduction states that the Dhammapada has "none of the stories, parables, and extended instruction that characterizes the main Buddhist scriptures, the sutras." Rather, the Dhammapada is 
a collection of vivid, practical verses, gathered probably from direct disciples who wanted to preserve what they had heard from the Buddha himself..... the equivalent of a handbook: a ready reference of the Buddha's teachings, condensed in haunting poetry and arranged by theme – anger, greed, fear, happiness, thought.
Each US edition's introduction has the same four major sections:

In each edition, short sections by Stephen Ruppenthal introduce individual chapters by providing background and clarifying Indian philosophical concepts. Many Buddhist philosophical terms are rendered in Sanskrit, and about 30 such terms are defined in a glossary. Endnotes provide more detailed clarification of particular verses, and the second edition contains a 5-page index.

Reception
Reviews have appeared in Smith and Novak's Buddhism: A Concise Introduction (2003), as well as in the 
Mountain Path, East West, Life Positive (India), the American Theosophist, Parabola, Voice of Youth Advocates, and websites.

In Buddhism: A Concise Introduction, influential scholar of religion Huston Smith and his coauthor Philip Novak wrote that "Our favorite translation is Eknath Easwaran's The Dhammapada. His Indian heritage, literary gifts, and spiritual sensibilities... here produce a sublime rendering of the words of the Buddha. Verse after verse shimmers with quiet, confident authority;" the introduction is described as "sparkling." Elsewhere, the publishers quote Smith as stating that no one else in "modern times" is as qualified as Easwaran to translate the Dhammapada and other Indian spiritual classics.

In the Mountain Path, P. S. Sundaram wrote that Easwaran
writes of mysticism not from the outside but as one who seems himself to have undergone the experience through profound... meditation. In his introduction he is less a guide post than a guide offering himself as a companion to the reader, and inviting him to take the plunge into the depths of being. 
Sundaram also stated that in comparison to the Radhakrishnan translation of the Dhammapada, "The present one... by Mr. Easwaran is superior to it in every way, introduction, translation and get-up, except only that it does not have the original [Pali] verses.... we may set Radhakrishnan's [translation] of the very first verse... beside Easwaran's.... The difference is the difference between a crib and a piece of literature, which is not the less faithful to the original for being a piece of literature."

In Life Positive, Suma Varughese wrote that 
Easwaran's Dhammapada has a tone which is easy and contemporary. It is at once energetic and clear as well as mellifluous.... [and] has a limpid clarity that homes right in. As a vehicle of Buddhist thought, the Dhammapada's haunting poetry adds beauty and emotion to what can often seem a rigorously intellectual discipline.

In Voice of Youth Advocates, Rakow and Capehart wrote that "The Buddha's direct teachings are poetic and arranged by theme... Introductory explanations to each verse will help young adult readers understand the text."

In other reviews, the translation was described as "exceptionally readable" (American Theosophist), or the introduction was described as "clear and lively" (Parabola), or as "inspiring and comprehensive" (East West).
The review in East West also quoted the introduction's claim that 
<blockquote>
[The Dhammapada'''s] verses can be read and appreciated simply as wise philosophy; as such, they are part of the great literature of the world. But for those who would follow it to the end, the Dhammapada is a sure guide to nothing less than the highest goal life can offer: self-realization.
</blockquote>

In 1989, The Guardian listed the book among the top 5 best-sellers on Buddhism. In 2009, the Journal of Religious History noted that among Dhammapada translations, Easwaran's had been "very popular." It also stated that because Easwaran situated the Dhammapada against the background of the Upanishads, his translation should be seen in the context of Hindu readings.

Editions
The book has been published in English, German, and Korean. English-language editions have been published in the US, the UK, and India. In the US, the book has also been issued by its original publisher as part of a series entitled Classics of Indian Spirituality''. The stand-alone US editions are:
;  (275 pages)
; ; ;  (208 pages)

UK edition:
;  (208 pages)

Indian editions:
;  (280 pages); Reprinted in 2010: ,  (275 pages).

;  (208 pages)

German edition:
;  (284 pages)

Korean edition:
 (online)  (267 pages)

References

1986 books
2007 non-fiction books
Philosophy books
Books about spirituality
Buddhism studies books
Indian non-fiction books
Works by Eknath Easwaran
21st-century Indian books
20th-century Indian books